Treadwell may refer to:

 Treadwell (name), includes a list of people with the name
 Treadwell (Droid), fictional character in Star Wars
 Treadwell gold mine, southeast of Juneau, Alaska
 Treadwell, Georgia, an unincorporated community
 Treadwell, New York, hamlet located within the town of Franklin in Delaware County
 Treadwell, Ontario
 Mount Treadwell, Marie Byrd Land, Antarctica
 Treadwell & Martin, former London architect firm
 Treadwell's Bookshop, a London bookshop specialising in esoteric and occult works.

See also
Tredwell, a variant spelling of this name